Dallasiella is an extinct genus of mackerel sharks that lived during the Late Cretaceous. It contains two valid species, D. willistoni and D. brachyodon, which have been found in North America and Europe. While formerly placed in the families Cretoxyrhinidae and Archaeolamnidae, it is now considered Lamniformes incertae sedis.

References

Sharks
Prehistoric shark genera